{{DISPLAYTITLE:C2H3Br3}}
The molecular formula C2H3Br3 (molar mass: 266.76 g/mol, exact mass: 263.7785 u) may refer to:

 Tribromoethanes
 1,1,1-Tribromoethane
 1,1,2-Tribromoethane